Zeehan Highway (also known as the Queenstown-Zeehan road) is a road between Zeehan and Queenstown in Western Tasmania.

Where it leaves the valley in which Queenstown lies, it is the junction with the Queenstown to Strahan road that is at Howards Plains on higher ground, that the highway proceeds north.  A little further north is the turnoff for the Lake Margaret Power Station, and then the turnoff for Anthony Road.

It crosses the Dundas River, Henty and Yolande rivers.

Although it was considered much earlier it  was being planned in the 1930s, following the completion of the Lyell Highway.

It was not completed until the 1960s, causing the Mount Lyell Mining and Railway Company to ship copper out of Queenstown via the Mount Lyell railway (now the West Coast Wilderness Railway) until the time of its completion.

It was the part of the route for trucks hauling copper ore from Mount Lyell Mining and Railway Company from the Queenstown mine to Melba Flats between 1962 and 1994.

It also is an alternative route between Strahan and Zeehan in the event of the Zeehan to Strahan road being blocked.

See also
 Lyell Highway

Notes

Roads in Western Tasmania